The East Germany women's national basketball team was the women's basketball side that represented East Germany in international competitions. After German reunification in 1990, the team ceased to exist and was succeeded by the present-day Germany women's national basketball team. The team won a bronze medal at the 1966 European Championship.

Competition records
Olympic Games
1976–1988 – Did not qualify

FIBA World Championship for Women
1953–1964 – Did not qualify
1967 – 4th place
1971–1990 – Did not qualify

EuroBasket Women
1950 – Did not qualify
1952 – 12th place
1954–1956 – Did not qualify
1958 – 9th place
1960–1962 – Did not qualify
1964 – 6th place
1966 – 3rd place
1968 – 4th place
1970 – Did not qualify
1972 – 7th place
1974–1989 – Did not qualify

See also
 Germany women's national basketball team

References

External links
 Archived records of German Democratic Republic team participations

Basketball in East Germany
Basketball teams in East Germany
Former national basketball teams
Women's national basketball teams
National sports teams of East Germany